Theophilus  is the name or honorary title of the person to whom the Gospel of Luke and the Acts of the Apostles are addressed (Luke 1:3, Acts 1:1). It is thought that both works were written by the same author, and often argued that the two books were originally a single unified work. Both were written in a refined Koine Greek, and the name  ("Theophilos"), as it appears therein, means friend of God or (be)loved by God or loving God in the Greek language. The true identity of Theophilus is unknown, with several conjectures and traditions around an identity. In English Theophilus is also written "Theophilos", both a common name and an honorary title among the learned (academic) Romans and Jews of the era. The life of Theophilus would coincide with the writing of Luke and the author of the Acts.

Theories about who Theophilus was

Coptic view 

Coptic tradition asserts that Theophilus was a person and not an honorary title. The Coptic Church claims that the person was a Jew of Alexandria. Similarly, John Wesley in his Notes on the New Testament recorded that Theophilus was "a person of eminent quality at Alexandria", which he understood to be the tradition 'of the ancients'.

Roman official 

Others say that Theophilus was probably a Roman official of some sort, because Luke referred to him as kratistos, "κράτιστε" – optime in the Latin Vulgate translation – meaning "most excellent" (Luke 1:3), although in the parallel introduction to Acts he is simply referred to as 'O Theophilus'.

Honorary title 

Honorary title (academia) tradition maintains that Theophilus was not a person. The word in Greek means "Friend of God" and thus both Luke and Acts were addressed to anyone who fits that description. In this tradition the author's targeted audience, as with all other canonical Gospels, were the learned (academic) but unnamed men of that era.

Paul's lawyer 

Some theologians (e.g. David Pawson) believe that Theophilus could have been Paul's lawyer during his trial period in Rome. To support this claim people appeal to the formal legalese present in the prologue to the Gospel such as "eye witnesses," "account," "carefully investigated," "know the certainty of things which you have been instructed." The conclusion of the Book of Acts ends with Paul still alive and under arrest awaiting trial, suggesting it was the intention of the author to update Theophilus on Paul's history to provide for an explanation of his travels and preaching and serve as evidence in support of his innocence under Roman law. Some also point to the parallel between the account of Jesus' trial before Pontius Pilate narrated in Luke's Gospel with the account of Paul's trials before Roman judges in the Book of Acts. In total, Jesus was declared innocent 3 times by Pontius Pilate as was Paul before various judges.

Jewish priest 

Some scholars  point to Theophilus ben Ananus, High Priest of the Temple in Jerusalem from 37 to 41. In this tradition Theophilus would have been both a kohen and a Sadducee. That would make him the son of Annas and brother-in-law of Caiaphas, raised in the Jewish Temple. Adherents claim that Luke's Gospel was targeted at Sadducee readers. This might explain a few features of Luke. He begins the story with an account of Zacharias the righteous priest who had a Temple vision of an angel. Luke quickly moves to account Mary's purification (niddah), Jesus' Temple redemption (pidyon ha-ben) rituals, and then to Jesus' pilgrimage to the Temple when he was twelve, possibly implying his bar mitzvah. He makes no mention of Caiaphas' role in Jesus' crucifixion and emphasizes Jesus' literal resurrection, including an ascension into heaven as a realm of spiritual existence (Acts 1:1). Luke also seems to stress Jesus' arguments with the Sadducees on points like legal grounds for divorce, the existence of angels, spirits, and an afterlife (Sadducees did not believe in the resurrection of the dead). If this was the case then Luke is trying to use Jesus' rebuttals and teachings to break down Theophilus' Sadducean philosophy, maybe with the hope that Theophilus would use his influence to get the Sadducees to cease their persecution of the Christians.

Most, if not all, of the commentaries on the Gospel of Luke say the "Question about the Resurrection" pericope presented in Lk. 20:27-40 is the only account in Luke of Jesus confronting the Sadducees. It is true that Luke only mentions the Sadducees by name once but it is not true that this pericope is the only one concerning the Sadducees. The Parables about the Good Samaritan, the Unjust Steward, the Rich Man and Lazarus and the Wicked Tenants are directed to the Sadducees who controlled the temple establishment. These parables are about unfaithful priests. They are the wicked sons of Eli.

All of the New Testament passages concerning alms and almsgiving, except one in Matthew, are in Luke-Acts. Therefore, these parables may be about alms, almsgiving and the proper use of the wealth controlled by the temple authorities. Luke's criticism focuses on the use of these temple resources by the religious aristocracy for their own selfish purposes. This means that the religious authorities controlled tremendous wealth that had been in times past properly distributed to the people as part of the institutional form of almsgiving. The priests in these parables are unfaithful, dishonest and disobedient because, inter alia, they have not invited the poor, the maimed, the lame and the blind to the banquet table. Once the office of the High Priest became non-hereditary, and available to the highest bidder, the institutional role of almsgiving was abandoned or reduced as the purchaser had to recoup his purchase price.

A minority view identifies Theophilus as a later high priest: Mattathias ben Theophilus who served from 65 to 66. Note that Luke refers to high priest Joseph ben Caiaphas simply as "Caiaphas". Thus, the reasoning goes, Luke used this pattern when addressing Theophilus.

References

Further reading
 Maier, Paul L.  The Flames of Rome.  (Kregel Publications, Grand Rapids, MI, 1981).
 Mauck, John W. Paul on Trial. (Thomas Nelson Publishers, Nashville, TN, 2001) Review of Paul on Trial: The Book of Acts as a Defense of Christianity ABEV: a bird's eye view.

External links
 "Theophilos.".  Strong's Greek Dictionary.
 
 

People in the canonical gospels
People in Acts of the Apostles
Gospel of Luke
Caiaphas